Senator Stanley may refer to:

Arthur Jehu Stanley Jr. (1901–2001), Kansas State Senate
Augustus Owsley Stanley (1867–1958), Kentucky State Senate
Bill Stanley (politician) (born 1967), Virginia State Senate
Paul Stanley (legislator) (born 1962), Tennessee State Senate
William Stillman Stanley Jr. (1838–?), Wisconsin State Senate